Wave was a Canadian pop rock duo composed of Dave Thomson and Paul Gigliotti. They formed in 1999 in Niagara Falls, Ontario and are best known for their 2001 singles, "California" and "Think It Over", both which were Top 10 radio hits in Canada. Their debut album Nothing as It Seems was a success, achieving gold certification. However, their second album State of Mind was a commercial failure. The band folded in 2003, with Thomson and Gigliotti pursuing separate careers in the music industry. The duo reunited in 2016 for a single show in their hometown.

Discography

Studio albums

Singles

References

External links
 [ Wave] at AllMusic
 Wave at Canoe
 Top40-Charts.com entry

Musical groups established in 1999
Musical groups disestablished in 2003
Musical groups from Niagara Falls, Ontario
Canadian pop music groups
1999 establishments in Ontario
2003 disestablishments in Ontario